Josemith Bermúdez (January 27, 1980 – July 31, 2021) was a Venezuelan actress and TV personality.

She died of ovarian cancer.

References

1980 births
2021 deaths
People from Caracas
20th-century Venezuelan actresses
21st-century Venezuelan actresses
Venezuelan film actresses
Venezuelan stage actresses
Venezuelan television actresses
Venezuelan women television presenters
Deaths from ovarian cancer